Cnemidochroma is a genus of beetles in the family Cerambycidae, containing the following species:

 Cnemidochroma buckleyi (Bates, 1879)
 Cnemidochroma coeruleum (Achard, 1910)
 Cnemidochroma lopesi Fragoso & Monné, 1989
 Cnemidochroma ohausi (Schmidt, 1924)
 Cnemidochroma phyllopoides (Schmidt, 1924)
 Cnemidochroma phyllopus (Guérin-Méneville, 1844)

References

Callichromatini